The functionality of mobile devices running the Android operating system, the most used mobile operating system globally, can be extended using "apps" – specialized software designed to offer users the means to use their devices for certain additional purposes. Such apps are compiled in the Android-native APK file format which allows easy redistribution of apps to end-users.

Most apps are distributed through Google's Play Store but many alternative software repositories, or app stores, exist. Alternative app stores use the "Unknown Sources" option of Android devices to install APK files directly via the Android Package Manager.

Google Play Store 

The Google Play Store (originally the Android Market), operated and developed by Google, serves as the official app store for the Android, allowing users to download apps developed with the Android software development kit (SDK) and published through Google. The store offers both free and paid apps. Apps exploiting hardware capabilities of a device can be targeted to users of devices with specific hardware components, such as a motion sensor (for motion-dependent games) or a front-facing camera (for online video calling). The Google Play store had over 50 billion app downloads in 2013 and has reached over 2.96 million apps published in 2020. 
-->

Although bundled with most Android devices, the Play Store is only available on devices that are certified within the "Android Compatibility Program". As a result, manufacturers of so-called "custom ROMs", i.e.,. modified versions of Android, are not allowed to bundle Google apps, including the Play Store, with their software. Compatibility can be restored by installing the Google apps from another source, such as OpenGApps, or using alternative app stores.

Manufacturer app stores 
In addition to some manufacturers not creating certified compatible versions of Android, some manufacturers have decided to bundle their own app stores, either in addition to the Play Store or as a replacement.

Such app stores include:
 Samsung Galaxy Store, which is installed on Samsung mobile devices alongside the Play Store.
 Amazon Appstore, which is installed instead of the Play Store on Amazon's Fire Phone and Kindle Fire. The Amazon Appstore can also be installed on other Android devices by downloading it from the Amazon website. This will also be the default way to install Android apps on Windows 11.
 Huawei AppGallery, which is installed on Huawei mobile devices. After Google Mobile Services ban, AppGallery is sole app distribution on Huawei's phones.
 Xiaomi Mi GetApps
 OPPO App Market
 VIVO App Store

Third-party app stores 
App stores that do not rely on pre-installation by the manufacturer are an alternate option for finding Android applications. Apps offered through third-party app stores or websites, created by parties not affiliated with the device or operating system (OS), are also third-party apps.

Such stores include:

 Aurora Store
 Amazon Appstore
 App Store Canada - Android Apps
 APKMirror
 APKpure
 Aptoide
ONE store (원스토어)
 XDA Labs
 F-Droid
 TapTap
 Tencent MyApp (应用宝)
 ACMarket
 Appswant (www.appswant.com)
 Uptodown
 Rootpk
 RuStore (Russian state-run app store used to circumvent the sanctions imposed after the invasion into Ukraine)

This form of app store is often used by web developers to distribute apps that are not allowed in the Google Play Store; this may be due to an app allowing users wider access to the app-system, or offering apps for "niche users" who choose to use only free and open-source software (F-Droid) or prefer to play indie games (Itch.io). Moreover, there are alternative stores that serve to distribute "hacked" versions of paid apps, for no cost.

Proxy App Store 

There are also proxy app stores that act as a client for Google Play store, such as Aurora Store.

See also 
 List of mobile app distribution platforms

References 

Android (operating system) software
Mobile software distribution platforms
Google lists